Érick Gabriel Gutiérrez Galaviz (born 15 June 1995) is a Mexican professional footballer who plays as a midfielder for Eredivisie club PSV Eindhoven and the Mexico national team.

Gutiérrez began both his youth and professional career at Pachuca, winning the 2016 Clausura title and the 2016–17 CONCACAF Champions League in his five years with the club. During the 2015–2016 season, he was named captain of the team at the age of 20. In August 2018, he joined PSV Eindhoven.

Gutiérrez has participated for various national youth teams, including the U-20 team and the U-23 side that played the 2016 Summer Olympics. At the senior level,  Gutiérrez has represented Mexico at the 2018 and 2022 FIFA World Cup, and won the 2019 edition of the CONCACAF Gold Cup.

Club career

Pachuca
Gutiérrez joined Pachuca of the Liga MX at the age of 12. In his early career he started as a right-back, then moved to midfield. He made his debut on 26 October 2013 as a starter in a 0–0 draw at home against Cruz Azul. He made ten more appearances including 4 more starts that season. He was made a permanent starter at the beginning of the 2014–15 Liga MX season under the management of Diego Alonso. Gutiérrez scored his first Liga MX goal on 7 February 2015 in a 1–1 home draw against Toluca. In April 2016, at the age of 20, Gutiérrez was assigned as Pachuca's captain after only 70 league matches. At the end of the Clausura 2016, he was named on the tournament's Best XI.

In his time at the club, he amassed 144 league appearances.

PSV
On 29 August 2018, Gutiérrez joined Dutch club PSV Eindhoven on a five-year contract, joining up with international teammate Hirving Lozano. He was handed jersey number 25. On 15 September, he made his debut with PSV against ADO; within five minutes of being subbed in, Gutiérrez assisted in Lozano's goal as well as scoring himself in their 7–0 away win. Three days later, he made his UEFA Champions League debut against Barcelona, coming on in the 82nd minute for Pablo Rosario in PSV's 4–0 defeat. On 30 October, he would score his first KNVB Cup goal during the second round match against RKC Waalwijk, scoring in the first minute of the game but PSV would go on losing 3–2.

The following season, he was handed the number 15 jersey. In September, he picked up a hand injury while training with the national team and returned in a match against PEC Zwolle, coming on as a substitute and scoring the fourth goal of the 4–0 victory.

During the 2020–21 season, Gutiérrez suffered from two different injuries, only playing 150 minutes during the whole Eredivisie season. In the subsequent season, he became more important for PSV, playing more games and scoring a goal in the KNVB Cup Final against Ajax.

On 11 August 2022, it was announced that Gutiérrez had signed a contract extension with PSV that runs until 2025. This was just one day after he scored in the team's 4–3 aggregate victory over AS Monaco in their Champions League Qualification game.

International career

Youth
Gutiérrez was called up by the under-20 team managed by Sergio Almaguer for the 2015 CONCACAF U-20 Championship. He was named captain of the team despite only playing only in four matches out of the six as Mexico went on to win the tournament and earned a berth to the 2015 FIFA U-20 World Cup in New Zealand. He would also be listed on the tournament's Best XI.

Selected to participate at the 2015 FIFA U-20 World Cup, he was Mexico's captain during the tournament as the team failed to pass the group stage.

On 18 September 2015, Gutiérrez was selected by coach Raúl Gutiérrez to play in the 2015 CONCACAF Men's Olympic Qualifying Championship.

He was also picked to represent Mexico at the 2016 Summer Olympics in Rio de Janeiro, Brazil.  On 7 August, he scored four goals as Mexico bounced back to win 5–1 after Fiji took the lead in the first half of the second group stage match.

Senior
In 2015 Gutiérrez was placed in the Mexico senior national team's provisional list for the 2015 CONCACAF Gold Cup but did not make the final 23-man squad.

He was named in Mexico's squad for a friendly against Senegal in February 2016. He would eventually make his debut with the senior national team on 11 October 2016, in a 1–0 friendly victory against Panama.

On 28 June 2017, Gutiérrez was called up to participate in the 2017 CONCACAF Gold Cup, managing to appear in all group stage games including the semi-final where Mexico lost 1–0 against Jamaica.

In May 2018, Gutiérrez was named in Mexico's preliminary squad for the 2018 FIFA World Cup. He originally did not make the final 23, but due to an injury to Diego Reyes, he was selected as a replacement.

He was included in Gerardo Martino's preliminary roster for the 2019 CONCACAF Gold Cup and was subsequently included in the final roster for the tournament. He would only appear in the second group stage match against Canada, where as a starter he would pick up a hamstring injury leaving him two weeks out. Mexico would go on to win the tournament, defeating rivals the United States. In a September friendly against the United States, he would score his first international goal, winning the match 3–0.

In October 2022, Gutiérrez was named in Mexico's preliminary 31-man squad for the 2022 FIFA World Cup, and in November, he was ultimately included in the final 26-man roster.

Style of play
A left-footed box-to-box midfielder who can also play as a deep-lying playmaker and the holding role, Gutiérrez started off his career as a defensive midfielder until then-Pachuca manager Diego Alonso opted to play him in a more advanced position. A versatile, intelligent, and creative player, he is good at reading the game, capable of picking out and completing key passes, possesses superb positioning, links plays together using his technical ability and vision on the ball, denies opposing advances, is capable of shooting from long-range, and is able to make dribbling runs from deep. His level of composure and maturity despite a young age has been shown in the leadership roles he assumes, captaining the Mexico U-20 team as well as his former club, Pachuca.

He has been compared to national team compatriot Andrés Guardado.

Career statistics

Club

International

Scores and results list Mexico's goal tally first, score column indicates score after each Gutiérrez goal.

Honours
Pachuca
Liga MX: Clausura 2016
CONCACAF Champions League: 2016–17

PSV
KNVB Cup: 2021–22
Johan Cruyff Shield: 2022

Mexico Youth
CONCACAF U-20 Championship: 2015
CONCACAF Olympic Qualifying Championship: 2015

Mexico
CONCACAF Gold Cup: 2019

Individual
CONCACAF U-20 Championship Best XI: 2015
Liga MX Best XI: Clausura 2016

References

External links

 Profile at the PSV Eindhoven website
 
 
 
 
 

1995 births
Living people
People from Ahome Municipality
Association football midfielders
Mexican footballers
Footballers from Sinaloa
Mexico youth international footballers
Mexico under-20 international footballers
Mexico international footballers
Liga MX players
Eredivisie players
C.F. Pachuca players
PSV Eindhoven players
Expatriate footballers in the Netherlands
Mexican expatriate sportspeople in the Netherlands
2015 CONCACAF U-20 Championship players
Footballers at the 2016 Summer Olympics
Olympic footballers of Mexico
2017 CONCACAF Gold Cup players
2018 FIFA World Cup players
Mexican expatriate footballers
2019 CONCACAF Gold Cup players
CONCACAF Gold Cup-winning players
2021 CONCACAF Gold Cup players
2022 FIFA World Cup players